Polypodium californicum is a species of fern known by the common name California polypody.

It is native to Baja California and California, where it grows along the coastline as well as in moist spots in coastal foothills and mountain ranges in the southern part of its distribution.

Description
This polypody anchors with a scaly rhizome. Each leaf is made up of many dull-pointed lance-shaped segments which may be thin or firm or somewhat fleshy, and have lightly serrated edges. The underside of each leaf segment is lined with a double row of flattened or sunken sori, which contain the spores.

External links

Jepson Manual Treatment: Polypodium californicum
USDA Plants Profile
Flora of North America
Polypodium californicum - Photo gallery

californicum
Ferns of California
Ferns of Mexico
Flora of Baja California
Flora of California
Natural history of the California chaparral and woodlands
Natural history of the California Coast Ranges
Natural history of the Channel Islands of California
Natural history of the Peninsular Ranges
Natural history of the San Francisco Bay Area
Natural history of the Santa Monica Mountains
Natural history of the Transverse Ranges
Ferns of the Americas
Flora without expected TNC conservation status